The Executioner is a 1963 Spanish black comedy film directed by Luis García Berlanga. It was filmed in black and white, and is widely considered a classic of Spanish cinema. The film won several awards, both in Spain and internationally.

Plot
Amadeo, an executioner in Madrid, meets José Luis, a funeral parlour employee who is going to pick up the prisoner that Amadeo has just executed. José Luis cannot find a girlfriend, since all girls leave him when they find out that he works in a funeral parlour. Amadeo's daughter, Carmen, cannot find a boyfriend, because all the candidates leave when they find out that her father is an executioner. Carmen and José Luis get to know each other and start a relationship that they declare to Amadeo when Carmen becomes pregnant.

Amadeo hopes that the government will give him a flat (given that he is a civil servant), but they refuse it because by the time they give it to him, he will be retired. He and his daughter trick José Luis into accepting the role of executioner to keep the housing, assuring him that he won't have to kill anybody. When an order arrives for an execution in Mallorca, José Luis is horrified and wants to resign, but this would mean losing the flat and returning the salary he has earned. Amadeo and Carmen tell him to wait until the final moment, since the prisoner is ill and will surely die before being executed. In the end, José Luis is dragged to the execution in despair, as if he were the convict instead of the executioner.

Cast
Nino Manfredi as José Luis Rodríguez, the undertaker
Emma Penella as Carmen, the daughter of Amadeo
José Isbert as Amadeo, the executioner (as Jose Isbert)
José Luis López Vázquez as Antonio Rodríguez, the older brother of José Luis
Ángel Álvarez as Álvarez, an undertaker, Rodríguez's colleague (as Angel Alvarez)
Guido Alberti as director of the prison
Julia Caba Alba as Mujer visitante de la obra nº 2
María Luisa Ponte as Estefanía (as Maria Luisa Ponte)
María Isbert as Ignacia (as Maria Isbert)
Erasmo Pascual
Xan das Bolas as Guarda de la obra
José Orjas (as Jose Orjas)
José María Prada (as Jose Maria Prada)
Félix Fernández as Monaguillo nº 2 (as Felix Fernandez)
Antonio Ferrandis

Real events
The final scene is inspired by the execution of Pilar Prades Expósito, carried out by the executioner Antonio López Sierra. Curiously, years after, José Monero also accepted the role of executioner, convinced that he wouldn't have to act, and wanted to resign when he was required for the execution of Heinz Ches, which he eventually carried out.

Awards
Director Luis García Berlanga won the FIPRESCI Prize at the Venice Film Festival for the film.
At that moment, Francoist Spain was under international pressure because of the death sentence for the Communist leader Julián Grimau.
The Spanish ambassador to Italy, Sánchez Vega, criticized the film as "communist."

Box office and reception
The film took an estimated gross of ESP 4,107,300 in Spain and there were some 32,907 viewers in cinemas across the country.

External links
 
The Executioner: By the Neck an essay by David Cairns at the Criterion Collection

1963 films
Films shot in Mallorca
Films set in the Balearic Islands
1960s Spanish-language films
Spanish black comedy films
Italian black-and-white films
Spanish black-and-white films
1963 comedy-drama films
Films directed by Luis García Berlanga
Films about capital punishment
Films produced by Nazario Belmar
Films with screenplays by Rafael Azcona